Paratettix curtipennis is a species of groundhopper which belongs to the subfamily Tetriginae and tribe Tetrigini.  Its distribution includes: India (type locality), southern China, including Tawan, Indo-China and peninsular Malaysia; no subspecies are listed in the Catalogue of Life or the Orthoptera Species File.

References

External links 
 

Tetrigidae
Orthoptera of Asia
Orthoptera of Indo-China
Insects described in 1912